A skyline is the outline or shape viewed near the horizon. It can be created by a city's overall structure, or by human intervention in a rural setting, or in nature that is formed where the sky meets buildings or the land.

City skylines serve as a pseudo-fingerprint as no two skylines are alike. For this reason, news and sports programs, television shows, and movies often display the skyline of a city to set a location. The term The Sky Line of New York City was first introduced in 1896, when it was the title of a color lithograph by Charles Graham for the color supplement of the New York Journal.
Paul D. Spreiregen, FAIA, has called a [city] skyline "a physical representation [of a city's] facts of life ... a potential work of art ... its collective vista."

Features

High-rise buildings

High-rise buildings, including skyscrapers, are the fundamental feature of urban skylines. Both contours and cladding (brick or glass) make an impact on the overall appearance of a skyline.

Towers

Towers from different eras make for contrasting skylines.

San Gimignano, in Tuscany, Italy, has been described as having an "unforgettable skyline" with its competitively built towers.

Remote locations

Some remote locations have striking skylines, created either by nature or by sparse human settlement in an environment not conducive to housing significant populations.

Architectural design
Norman Foster served as architect for the Gherkin in London and the Hearst Tower in Midtown Manhattan, and these buildings have added to their cities' skylines.

Use in media
Skylines are often used as backgrounds and establishing shots in film, television programs, news websites, and in other forms of media.

Subjective ranking
Several services rank skylines based on their own subjective criteria. Emporis is one such service, which uses height and other data to give point values to buildings and add them together for skylines. The three cities it ranks highest are Hong Kong, Seoul and Shenzhen.

See also
 Cityscape
 Skyscraper Index
 List of cities with the most skyscrapers

References

Further reading
 Emporis ranking of cities by the visual impact of their skylines

External links

Architectural terminology
City
Panoramic art
Skyscrapers
Cityscapes